Taylor St Baristas is a British coffee shop chain, with 10 branches, nine in central London, and one in New York City.

It was established by Andrew, Nick and Laura Tolley who quit Harris + Hoole the coffee shop chain they established in 2012 with investment from the British supermarket chain Tesco, and subsequently became 100% owned by them. The Tolleys left the running of Harris + Hoole in July 2015, in order to concentrate on their Taylor St Baristas chain.

Administration

Asher Miller and Henry Lan of David Rubin & Partners were appointed as Joint Administrators of the Company on 19 July 2019. The affairs, business and property of the Company are being managed by the Joint Administrators, licensed to act as Insolvency Practitioners in the UK by the ICAEW. A claim that preferential payment(s) were made by the directors is being investigated by the administrators.

References

External links
 – official site

British companies established in 2012
Companies based in the City of London
Coffeehouses and cafés in the United Kingdom